The 2002 Suwon Samsung Bluewings season was Suwon Samsung Bluewings's seventh season in the K-League in Republic of Korea. Suwon Samsung Bluewings is competing in K-League, League Cup, Korean FA Cup, Asian Club Championship and Asian Super Cup.

Squad

Backroom Staff

Coaching Staff
Head coach:  Kim Ho
Assistant coach:  Wang Sun-Jae
Coach:  Yoon Sung-Hyo
GK Coach:  Cosa
Video analyst:  Afshin Ghotbi

Scouter
 Jung Kyu-Poong

Honours

Club
Asian Club Championship Winners
Asian Super Cup Winners
Korean FA Cup Winners

Individual
K-League Best XI:  Lee Woon-Jae,  Seo Jung-Won
Korean FA Cup MVP:  Seo Jung-Won

References

External links
 Suwon Bluewings Official website

Suwon Samsung Bluewings seasons
Suwon Samsung Bluewings